Sir William Reynell Anson, 3rd Baronet,  (14 November 18434 June 1914) was a British jurist and Liberal Unionist turned Conservative politician from the Anson family.

Background and education
Anson was born at Walberton, Sussex, the eldest son of Sir John William Hamilton Anson, 2nd Baronet, and his wife Elizabeth Catherine (née Pack). Educated at Eton, 1857–62, and Balliol College, Oxford, 1862–66, he took a first class in both Classical Moderations, 1863, and Literae Humaniores ('Greats', a combination of philosophy and ancient history), 1866. He was elected to a fellowship of All Souls in the following year.

Legal and political career

In 1869, he was called to the Bar, and went on the home circuit until 1873, when he succeeded to the baronetcy. In 1874, he became Vinerian reader in English law at Oxford, a post attached to a Fellowship of All Souls College, which he held until he became, in 1881, Warden of All Souls.

Anson identified himself both with local and university interests; he became an alderman of the city of Oxford in 1892, chairman of quarter sessions for the county in 1894, was Vice-Chancellor of Oxford University in 1898–1899, and Chancellor of the Diocese of Oxford in 1899. In that year he was returned, without opposition, as Member of Parliament (MP)  for Oxford University in the Liberal Unionist interest, and consequently resigned the vice-chancellorship.

In Parliament, Anson preserved an active interest in education, being a member of the newly created consultative committee of the Board of Education in 1900, and in August 1902 he became the first Parliamentary Secretary to the Board of Education, a post he held until 1905. He was made a Privy Counsellor in 1911.

Anson took an active part in the foundation of a school of law at Oxford, and taught law to undergraduates of Trinity College, Oxford, from 1886 to 1898. His volumes on The Principles of the English Law of Contract (1884, 11th ed. 1906), and on The Law and Custom of the Constitution in two parts, "The Parliament" and "The Crown" (1886–1892, 3rd ed. 1907, pt. 1 .vol. ii.), became standard works.

He received the honorary degree Doctor of Laws (LL.D.) from the Victoria University of Manchester in February 1902, in connection with the 50th jubilee celebrations of the establishment of the university.

He was on the governing body of Abingdon School from 1900 until his death in 1914.

Personal life
Anson died in June 1914, aged 70. He never married and was succeeded in the baronetcy by his nephew, Denis.

See also
Oxford Dictionary of National Biography
English contract law

References

Further reading
Anson's Law of Contract (29th edn, OUP, 2010) now edited by J Beatson, A Burrows and J Cartwright.

External links

 Pictures in the National Portrait Gallery (London)

1843 births
1914 deaths
People from Walberton
People educated at Eton College
Alumni of Balliol College, Oxford
Baronets in the Baronetage of the United Kingdom
Fellows of All Souls College, Oxford
Wardens of All Souls College, Oxford
Vice-Chancellors of the University of Oxford
Members of the Privy Council of the United Kingdom
Liberal Unionist Party MPs for English constituencies
Members of the Parliament of the United Kingdom for the University of Oxford
UK MPs 1895–1900
UK MPs 1900–1906
UK MPs 1906–1910
UK MPs 1910
UK MPs 1910–1918
Members of Oxford City Council
William
Conservative Party (UK) MPs for English constituencies
Legal scholars of the University of Oxford
Fellows of the British Academy
Governors of Abingdon School
English barristers